Robert Hurley may refer to:

 Robert A. Hurley (1895–1968), American politician and governor of Connecticut
 Robert Hurley (translator), French-English translator
 Robert Hurley (swimmer) (born 1988), Australian swimmer